Amphigeisinidae is an extinct family of conodonts in the order Paraconodontida.

Genera
Genera are:
 †Amphigeisina
 †Gapparodus
 †Hagionella
 †Phakelodus
 †Protohertzina

References

External links 

Paraconodontida
Conodont families